The Substitute Wife is a 1925 American silent drama film written by Katherine Smith and directed by Wilfred Noy.

Plot
A man, suddenly gone blind, mistakes another woman for his wife. When nurse Hilda Nevers returns from the Orient, she is left penniless because her father has died. She goes to work at a hospital where Dr. Kitchell is impressed by her voice, which is almost identical to that of his lover, Evelyn Wentworth. Evelyn is engaged to Lawrence Sinton, but only for his money. On their wedding night, Sinton is blinded when a burglar hits him on the head. Hilda is substituted for Evelyn, who is then free to continue her affair with the doctor. A family friend finally exposes the situation, but by then, Hilda and Sinton have fallen in love. Sinton has an operation that restores his sight, and he and Hilda are united.

Cast
 Jane Novak as Hilda Nervers
 Niles Welch as Lawrence Sinton
 Coit Albertson as Victor Bronson
 Louise Carter as Evelyn Wentworth
 Gordon Standing as Doctor Kitchell
 Mario Majeroni as Doctor De Longe

Preservation status
The film survives in the Library of Congress collection, Packard Campus for Audio-Visual Conservation.

References

External links

1925 films
American black-and-white films
American silent feature films
Films directed by Wilfred Noy
1925 drama films
Silent American drama films
Arrow Film Corporation films
1920s American films